Theodorus Anton "Dick" Nieuwenhuizen (born 6 April 1957) is a retired Dutch water polo player. He competed at the 1980 and 1984 Olympics and finished in sixth place at both Games. At the end of the 1990s he briefly coached the Dutch team.

References
 Dick Nieuwenhuizen. sports-reference.com

1957 births
Living people
Dutch male water polo players
Olympic water polo players of the Netherlands
Water polo players at the 1980 Summer Olympics
Water polo players at the 1984 Summer Olympics
Sportspeople from Hilversum
20th-century Dutch people